Aurora is a town in Taylor County, Wisconsin, United States. The population was 386 at the 2000 census.

Geography
According to the United States Census Bureau, the town has a total area of 34.2 square miles (88.6 km2), all of it land.

History
In the mid-summer of 1847, a crew working for the U.S. government surveyed a six-mile (10 km) square which approximates the current boundaries of Aurora. In December 1854, another crew marked all the section corners in the township, walking through the woods and swamps, measuring them with a chain and a compass. When done, the deputy surveyor filed this general description:
This Township contains a few swamps some of considerable extent they are all unfit for cultivation. The River Enters the Town Near the NE Corner of section 24 and flows in a WSWesterly course with a Gentle current except a few Riffles where the current becomes Rapid. The soil is principally 2d rate. This Township is covered with timber The greater portion of which is Hemlock Y Birch Elm and Sugar. A number of small streams rise in this Township and flow in a SWesterly course toward its west boundary. The swamp except Alder are covered with moss(?). There is no improvements on this Township.

Demographics
As of the census of 2000, there were 386 people, 134 households, and 108 families residing in the town. The population density was 11.3 people per square mile (4.4/km2). There were 154 housing units at an average density of 4.5 per square mile (1.7/km2). The racial makeup of the town was 98.19% White, 0.26% Native American, 0.52% Asian, and 1.04% from two or more races.

There were 134 households, out of which 37.3% had children under the age of 18 living with them, 71.6% were married couples living together, 5.2% had a female householder with no husband present, and 19.4% were non-families. 17.2% of all households were made up of individuals, and 9.0% had someone living alone who was 65 years of age or older. The average household size was 2.88 and the average family size was 3.25.

In the town, the population was spread out, with 30.1% under the age of 18, 9.6% from 18 to 24, 21.5% from 25 to 44, 24.6% from 45 to 64, and 14.2% who were 65 years of age or older. The median age was 37 years. For every 100 females, there were 107.5 males. For every 100 females age 18 and over, there were 101.5 males.

The median income for a household in the town was $30,417, and the median income for a family was $34,583. Males had a median income of $29,500 versus $20,625 for females. The per capita income for the town was $14,374. About 17.5% of families and 22.6% of the population were below the poverty line, including 35.1% of those under age 18 and 10.4% of those age 65 or over.

References

Towns in Taylor County, Wisconsin
Towns in Wisconsin